Ernst Sigfrid Lundberg (15 February 1895 – 19 May 1979) was a Swedish cyclist who competed at the 1920 Summer Olympics. He won a silver medal as part of the Swedish road cycling team, after finishing 22nd in the individual road race.

Lundberg was a welder by trade. He took part in 10 national championships and won at least 5 team titles.

References

External links

profile

1895 births
1979 deaths
Swedish male cyclists
Olympic cyclists of Sweden
Cyclists at the 1920 Summer Olympics
Olympic silver medalists for Sweden
Olympic medalists in cycling
People from Uppsala Municipality
Medalists at the 1920 Summer Olympics
Sportspeople from Uppsala County
19th-century Swedish people
20th-century Swedish people